Ernst Mader (born 4 January 1968) is a retired Austrian football midfielder.

References

1968 births
Living people
Austrian footballers
FK Austria Wien players
First Vienna FC players
FC Admira Wacker Mödling players
Floridsdorfer AC players
Kremser SC players
Association football midfielders
Austrian Football Bundesliga players